Herbert Birchell "Bert" Remsen (February 25, 1925 – April 22, 1999) was an American actor and casting director. He appeared in numerous films and television series.

Biography
Remsen was born in Glen Cove, New York, on Long Island, the son of Helen (née Birchell) and Winfred Herbert Remsen.

He played character roles in numerous films directed by Robert Altman, including Brewster McCloud (1970), McCabe & Mrs. Miller (1971), Thieves Like Us (1974), California Split (1974), Nashville (1975), Buffalo Bill and the Indians, or Sitting Bull's History Lesson (1976), and A Wedding (1978).

Remsen's other film credits included Fuzz (1972), Baby Blue Marine (1976), Uncle Joe Shannon (1978), Fast Break (1979), Carny (1980), Borderline (1980), Inside Moves (1980), Second-Hand Hearts (1981), Lookin' to Get Out (1982), The Sting II (1983), Places in the Heart (1984), Code of Silence (1985), TerrorVision (1986), Eye of the Tiger (1986), Miss Firecracker (1989), Sundown: The Vampire in Retreat (1989), Daddy's Dyin': Who's Got the Will? (1990), and Only the Lonely (1991). His last film was the posthumously released The Sky is Falling (2000).

He also appeared in various television guest-starring roles, including the role of Jim Ford in the episode "Pete Henke" of the 1958 NBC western series, Jefferson Drum, starring Jeff Richards. He was a regular in the cast of the short-lived 1976 NBC dramatic television series Gibbsville, a regular in the first season (1980-1981) of the ABC comedy television series It's a Living as Mario the cook, and appeared on Dallas in 1987 as Harrison 'Dandy' Dandridge. He portrayed a judge in the pilot for The Adventures of Brisco County, Jr. (1993).

After suffering an injury on the set of a television show, Remsen had moved away from acting, working in casting from 1966 to 1974. Other than one voice credit over the next few years (an announcer's voice in a 1969 episode of The F.B.I.), he did not return to acting until 1970, when he was hired as the casting director on Brewster McCloud, where director Altman talked him into taking a small role in the film instead. During his nine years as a casting director and casting supervisor, in addition to a slowly increasing workload on screen, Remsen was casting director for 31 different television series or television movies, including 25 episodes each of The F.B.I. and The Rookies.

Personal life
Seaman 1/c Herbert B. Remsen was a crew member on the destroyer USS Laffey during the Battle of Okinawa in World War II. On April 16, 1945, the USS Laffey was attacked by 22 Japanese kamikaze planes during an 80-minute period. Remsen suffered burns during the battle but was able to return to duty and survive what the US Navy called, "one of the great sea epics of war".

He was first married to actress Katherine MacGregor, who played Mrs. Oleson in the NBC television series Little House on the Prairie. His daughter, with second wife Barbara Joyce Dodd, a casting director, is actress Kerry Remsen.

Select acting filmography

Film

Pork Chop Hill (1959) - Lieutenant Cummings
Tess of the Storm Country (1960) - Mike Foley
Moon Pilot (1962) - Agent Brown
Kid Galahad (1962) - Max (uncredited)
Dead Ringer (1964) - Dan Lister
The Lollipop Cover (1965) - Salesman
The Strawberry Statement (1970) - Policeman at Gate
Brewster McCloud (1970) - Officer Douglas Breen
McCabe & Mrs. Miller (1971) - Bart Coyle
Fuzz (1972) - Sergeant Murchison
Thieves Like Us (1974) - 'T-Dub'
California Split (1974) - Helen Brown
Nashville (1975) - Star
Baby Blue Marine (1976) - Mr. Hudkins
Harry and Walter Go to New York (1976) - Guard O'Meara
Buffalo Bill and the Indians, or Sitting Bull's History Lesson (1976) - The Bartender (Crutch)
Tarantulas: The Deadly Cargo (1977, TV Movie) - Mayor Douglas
A Wedding (1978) - William Williamson
Uncle Joe Shannon (1978) - Braddock
Fast Break (1979) - Bo Winnegar
Joni (1979) - John Eareckson
Carny (1980) - Delno Baptiste
Borderline (1980) - Carl J. Richards
Inside Moves (1980) - 'Stinky'
Second-Hand Hearts (1981) - Voyd
Lookin' to Get Out (1982) - 'Smitty'
Independence Day (1983) - 'Red' Malone
The Sting II (1983) - 'Kid Colors'
Lies (1983) - Murrey Haliday
Policewoman Centerfold - Captain Buckman
Places in the Heart (1984) - 'Tee Tot' Hightower
Code of Silence (1985) - Commander Kates
Stand Alone (1985) - Paddie
TerrorVision (1986) - Grampa
Tai-Pan (1986)
Eye of the Tiger (1986) - Father Healey
P.K. and the Kid (1987) - Al
Three for the Road (1987) - Stu
Remote Control (1988) - Bill Denver
South of Reno (1988) - Howard Stone
Miss Firecracker (1989) - Mr. Morton
Sundown: The Vampire in Retreat (1989) - Milt
Curfew (1989) - Gentleman with Cane
Vietnam, Texas (1990) - Monsignor Sheehan
Daddy's Dyin': Who's Got the Will? (1990) - Daddy
Peacemaker (1990) - 'Doc'
Dick Tracy (1990) - Bartender
Jezebel's Kiss (1990) - Dr. Samuel Whatley
Evil Spirits (1990) - John Wilson
Payback (1991) - Burt
Only the Lonely (1991) - 'Spats'
The Player (1992) - Bert Remsen
Loving Lulu (1992)
The Bodyguard (1992) - Rotary Club President
Joshua Tree (1993) - Woody Engstrom
Jack the Bear (1993) - Mitchell
In the Shadows, Someone's Watching (1993, TV movie) - Oliver London
Maverick (1994) - Riverboat Poker Player #7
White Man's Burden (1995) - Hot Dog Vendor
Conspiracy Theory (1997) - Mr. Sutton
Road Ends (1997) - Arliss
Hugo Pool (1997) - Sad Old Man
The Sky Is Falling (1999) - Mr. Finch
Forces of Nature (1999) - Ned
A Walk in the Park (1999) - Ken Sherry (final film role)

Television

References

External links

 
 
 
 

1925 births
1999 deaths
Male actors from New York (state)
American male film actors
United States Navy personnel of World War II
American casting directors
People from Glen Cove, New York
People from Greater Los Angeles
United States Navy sailors
Burials at Forest Lawn Memorial Park (Hollywood Hills)
20th-century American male actors
Burn survivors